Street player may refer to:
Busker
prostitute
Street Player (song), a song by the band Chicago